Wakefield High School may refer to:

Wakefield High School (Kansas) in Wakefield, Kansas
Wakefield Memorial High School in Wakefield, Massachusetts
Wakefield High School (Nebraska) in Wakefield, Nebraska
Wakefield High School (Raleigh, North Carolina)
Wakefield High School (Arlington County, Virginia)
Wakefield Girls' High School, Wakefield, West Yorkshire, England